Henryk Pietrek (born 15 April 1942) is a Polish footballer. He played in one match for the Poland national football team in 1963.

References

External links
 

1942 births
Living people
Polish footballers
Poland international footballers
Place of birth missing (living people)
Association footballers not categorized by position